Samuel Eliot Morison Award may refer to:

 Samuel Eliot Morison Award (American Heritage), established in 1976 by American Heritage Publishing Company
 Samuel Eliot Morison Award (USS Constitution Museum), established in 1977 by USS Constitution Museum
 Samuel Eliot Morison Award for Naval Literature, established in 1982 by the New York Commandery of the Naval Order of the United States
 Samuel Eliot Morison Prize, established in 1985 by the Society for Military History